Telephone numbers in Christmas Island use ranges owned by Australia.

Format +61 8 9164 XXXX

Christmas Island numbers used the +672 country code until 1994, when they were migrated to +61.

References

Communications in Christmas Island
Telephone numbers in Australia